Andraegoidus cruentatus is a species of beetle in the family Cerambycidae. It was described by Dupont in 1838.

Distribution
This species can be found in Paraguay, Argentina, Brasil and Uruguay.

References

  Biolib
 Miguel A. Monné, Larry G. Bezark  Checklist of the Cerambycidae, or longhorned beetles (Coleoptera) of the Western Hemisphere

Trachyderini
Beetles described in 1838